Outback 8 is a TV show that was broadcast on Network Ten in Australia and BBC in the UK in 2008. The show features two girls and two boys each from the UK and Australia and was set at the Agricultural Training College in Longreach, Queensland. There were 13 episodes, beginning on 22 September 2008 and every Monday for 13 weeks

Synopsis
Outback 8 shows the children learning the skills to become jackaroos and jillaroos in an effort to be able to participate in a final muster of 200 head of cattle from hectares of land. The skills they learnt included horse riding, sheep shearing, pregnancy testing of cattle, bush survival skills, camping and mustering skills.

Episode guide

References

Network 10 original programming
Australian children's television series
2000s British children's television series
2008 Australian television series debuts
2008 Australian television series endings
2008 British television series debuts
2008 British television series endings
Television shows set in the Outback